Clifford M. Trump (born March 25, 1937) served as interim President of Idaho State University.

References

Presidents of Idaho State University
Living people
1937 births
Place of birth missing (living people)